π Gruis, Latinised as Pi Gruis, is an optical double comprising two unrelated stars in the constellation Grus appearing close by line of sight:
 π1 Gruis (HR 8521), a semiregular S-type star
 π2 Gruis (HR 8524), an F-type star

Gruis, Pi
Grus (constellation)